The shortnose eagle ray (Myliobatis ridens) is a species of eagle ray that lives in the southwestern Atlantic Ocean off Brazil, Uruguay and Argentina.

References

Myliobatis
Fish described in 2012